Fergus Dunlop Morton, Baron Morton of Henryton, MC, PC (17 October 1887 – 18 July 1973) was a British judge who was a Lord of Appeal in Ordinary from 1947 to 1959.

Background and education
Born in Glasgow, Morton was the youngest child of George Morton and Janet, née Wilson. His father, from a farming family, left school aged thirteen and acquired a considerable fortune as a stockbroker. He was educated at Kelvinside Academy and then went to St John's College, Cambridge with an open scholarship in classics. Morton narrowly missed first class honours in part one of the classical tripos in 1909 owing to illness, before taking first class honours in part two of the law tripos in 1910, topping the class list.

Legal career

After a year with a firm of solicitors, Morton was called to the English bar by the Inner Temple in 1912, also joining Lincoln's Inn in 1914. He was first the pupil of the conveyancer A. L. Ellis, then of leading Chancery junior Dighton Pollock.

On the outbreak of the First World War in 1914, he was commissioned as lieutenant into the Highland Light Infantry. He saw action in German East Africa, and was promoted to captain in 1915. In July 1918, he was awarded the Military Cross. Both of his brothers were killed in the war.

From 1918–19, Morton was attached to the War Office, before resuming his career at the Chancery bar. His practice grew rapidly, and he became a King's Counsel in 1929. In 1932 he was elected a bencher of Lincoln's Inn (serving as treasurer in 1953).

Judicial career 
Morton was appointed to the High Court of Justice in 1938, receiving the customary knighthood, and was assigned to the Chancery Division. From 1941, he chaired the Black List Committee for the following five years. He was appointed a Lord Justice of Appeal in 1944 and on this occasion was sworn of the Privy Council. Three years thereafter the number of the Lords of Appeal in Ordinary was increased to nine and one of the new seats was assigned to Morton. He obtained the traditional life peerage, taking the title Baron Morton of Henryton, of Henryton, in the County of Ayr.

Morton joined the Council of Legal Education in 1949, which he left after four years. In 1950 he sat in the Committee on the Law of Intestate Succession (named the Morton Committee) and in the subsequent year he became chairman of the Royal Commission on Marriage and Divorce (named the Morton Commission). Lincoln's Inn selected him its treasurer in 1953. He retired as Lord of Appeal in 1959.

Honours 
In 1940, he was nominated an honorary fellow by his former college and in 1951 received Honorary Doctorates of Law by the University of Cambridge as well as the University of Glasgow. Cambridge's Senate elected Morton a Deputy High Steward in 1954. Two years later, the University of St Andrews and in 1957 the University of Sydney conferred additional doctorates upon him. Both the American Bar Association and the Canadian Bar Association made Morton honorary members. He became also an honorary member of the Faculty of Advocates.

Notable decisions 
Margarine Reference [1951] AC 179 – Canadian federalism
Paris v Stepney Borough Council [1951] AC 367 – standard of care
Canada Steamship Lines Ltd v R [1952] AC 192 – unfair terms contra proferentem
Lister v Romford Ice and Cold Storage Co Ltd [1957] AC 555 – vicarious liability

Family
Morton married Margaret Greenlees, elder daughter of James Begg; they had a daughter. He died aged 85 in 1973.

Arms

Notes

References

External links

1887 births
1973 deaths
Alumni of St John's College, Cambridge
Knights Bachelor
Morton of Henryton
Members of the Judicial Committee of the Privy Council
Members of the Privy Council of the United Kingdom
Recipients of the Military Cross
Chancery Division judges
People educated at Kelvinside Academy
Lawyers from Glasgow
Highland Light Infantry officers
Members of Lincoln's Inn
Knights Grand Cross of the Order of Orange-Nassau
Recipients of the Medal of Freedom
Lords Justices of Appeal
Life peers created by George VI